is a passenger railway station located in Kawasaki-ku, Kawasaki, Kanagawa Prefecture, Japan, operated by the private railway operator Keikyū.

Lines
Higashimonzen Station is served by the Keikyū Daishi Line and is located 3.2 kilometers from the opposing terminus of the line at Keikyū Kawasaki  Station.

Station layout
The station consists of two opposed side platforms connected by a level crossing.

Platforms

History
Higashimonzen Station opened on August 15, 1925 as a station on the Kaigan Electric Transport. The station was closed on December 1, 1937, but reopened as a station on June 1, 1944 under the Tokyu Corporation. Keihin Electric Express Railway took over the station from June 1, 1948 after it was spun off from Tokyu.

Keikyū introduced station numbering to its stations on 21 October 2010; Higashimonzen Station was assigned station number KK24.

Future plans 
It is planned to move the station underground to reduce the number of level crossings on the line, with construction completing around 2023.

Passenger statistics
In fiscal 2019, the station was used by an average of 13,062 passengers daily. 

The passenger figures for previous years are as shown below.

Surrounding area
 Japan National Route 409
Kawasaki Ward Office Daishi Branch
Kawasaki City Higashimonzen Elementary School
Kawasaki City Daishi Elementary School

See also
 List of railway stations in Japan

References

External links

  

Railway stations in Kanagawa Prefecture
Railway stations in Japan opened in 1925
Keikyū Daishi Line
Railway stations in Kawasaki, Kanagawa